Sir John Philipps, 1st Baronet (died 27 March 1629) was a Welsh landowner and politician who sat in the House of Commons in 1601.

Philipps was the son of Morgan Philipps of Picton and his wife Elizabeth Fletcher, daughter of Richard Fletcher of Bangor, Caernarvonshire. He was registrar of the diocese of Bangor. In 1585 he succeeded to the estate of Picton Castle which had passed to his father from William Philipps who was MP for Pembrokeshire in 1559. He spent much of his life involved in property disputes. He was High Sheriff of Pembrokeshire in 1597.

In 1601, Philipps was elected Member of Parliament for Pembrokeshire.   He was appointed a J.P on 13 April 1603. In 1611 he was High Sheriff of Pembrokeshire again. He was created a baronet on 9 November 1621. He was High Sheriff of Carmarthenshire for 1622–23. Philipps died in 1629 and was buried at Slebech.

Family
Philipps married firstly Anne Perrot, daughter of Sir John Perrot and half-sister of Sir Thomas Perrot. He married secondly Margaret Dennys, daughter of Sir Thomas Dennys of Bicton, Devon. He was succeeded in the baronetcy by his son, Richard. His daughter Dorothy married Francis Annesley, 1st Viscount Valentia and was mother of Arthur, 1st Earl of Anglesey

References

Year of birth missing
1629 deaths
Members of the Parliament of England (pre-1707) for constituencies in Wales
People from Bangor, Gwynedd
High Sheriffs of Pembrokeshire
High Sheriffs of Carmarthenshire
Welsh landowners
English MPs 1601
Baronets in the Baronetage of England